Shing Yin Khor is a Malaysian-American artist and cartoonist. They are the creator of the comics The American Dream? A Journey on Route 66, The Center for Otherworld Science and Say it with Noodles, the last of which won them an Ignatz Award. Khor's middle grade graphic novel, The Legend of Auntie Po, earned an Eisner Award and was a finalist for the 2021 National Book Award for Young People's Literature.

Biography 
Khor grew up in Malaysia and later moved to the United States of America. They have lived in the US for over a decade and they are an American citizen.

Works

The Center for Otherworld Science 
Shing Yin Khor is the creator of the webcomic The Center for Otherworld Science, in which scientists are experimenting on flora and fauna of a place called the Otherworld. These experiments have led to advances, such as eradicating Sickle cell anemia, but are morally dubious. After an incident leads to the death of one worker, the survivors must deal with the fallout of the accident and face the emotional and existential consequences.

A review of the webcomic for The Beat said that it "combines otherworldly creatures and fantastic settings with the mundane details of working in a professional setting and the small moments shared between three coworkers. The result is a comic that feels both familiar and ethereal simultaneously, a sense that is only underscored by the simple and extremely effective art.

Say it with Noodles 
Say it with Noodles: On Learning to Speak the Language of Food was a standalone comic about Khor's relationship with their grandmother and how cooking for someone can be a love language. It won the Ignatz Award for Outstanding Minicomic in 2018.

The American Dream? A Journey on Route 66 
The American Dream? A Journey on Route 66: Discovering Dinosaur Statues, Muffler Men, and the Perfect Breakfast Burrito is an autobiographical graphic novel by Shing Yin Khor. It described a road trip they took along U.S. Route 66, in part to discover themselves and the other America (outside of their home of Los Angeles) they knew little about. The novel covers the history of Route 66 and the boom and bust its populations have faced, while visiting and drawing kitschy tourist traps, giant sculptures and abandoned roadside attractions.

A reviewer for The A.V. Club said of the novel, "If not for Khor's art, the book might have still been a bit of a dry read. But rich with water colors and visible sketch lines under finished shapes, it feels organic and alive. It's rich with texture and soft shapes, smiling faces that are simple without being overly cartoonish. There are several double-page spreads that capture the incredible vistas and remarkable secrets Route 66 holds for travelers... Khor's awe and frustration and joy as they encounter new things are all palpable. It makes clear how Khor's own experiences and needs shaped their trip and the book itself, which leads gracefully into exploration of Khor's complicated relationship with America as an immigrant... It's a journey made up of the weird and wonderful, as well as the deeply concerning ways that people leave their mark on the world." Kirkus Reviews said, "Through bright, expressive watercolor illustrations, Khor portrays the memorable locations they pass through... They detail both the amusing (going to the bathroom outdoors) and emotional (loneliness and exhaustion) challenges of being a traveler. Khor's pilgrimage is as much an exploration of themself as it is of nostalgic Americana. Their travels inspire them to share insights into their path to atheism, their anger with xenophobia and racism—which are provoked when they find a motel labeled "American owned"—and the meaning of "home." Many of Khor's observations will resonate with those who have questioned national identity and the sense of belonging."

Other work 
Khor has produced work for HuffPost, The Nib and The Toast. They also contributed to the comics anthology Elements: Earth. They have also created installation art and sculpture, and received coverage from the Smithsonian for recreating other artworks in Animal Crossing: New Horizons.

References 

Malaysian cartoonists
American cartoonists